The women's singles tennis event at the 2011 Summer Universiade will be held from August 14–21 at the Longgang Tennis Center and the Shenzhen Tennis Center in Shenzhen, China.

Seeds
The first two seeds have a bye into the second round.

Main draw

Finals

Top half

Section 1

Section 2

Bottom half

Section 3

Section 4

Consolation draw

Consolation finals

Consolation main draw

Top half

Bottom half

References

Main Draw
Consolation Main Draw

Women's Singles